Dzedka is a character of Belarusian mythology. Dzedka is a good mythological creature. It is considered to be the symbol of richness and fortune companion.

Description 
Dzedka is described as an old man with long red beard and red eyes. Dzedka wears simple clothes and looks like a beggar with a bag.

Mode of life

According to Belarusian folk beliefs, in the daytime Dzedka walks around the roads and fields. When a person meets Dzedka, prior to noticing it, this person falls asleep. When the person wakes up, he or she discovers a desired sum of money.

If rich, but unhappy people meet Dzedka, it shows such people in a dream what they need to do to become happy.

See also
 Damavik
 Lazavik
 Shatans
 Younik
 Zheuzhyk
 Zhytsen
 Zlydzens

References

Slavic legendary creatures
Slavic folklore characters